Tolidomordella is a genus of beetles in the family Mordellidae, containing the following species:

Tolidomordella discoidea (Melsheimer, 1845)
Tolidomordella discoidea discoidea (Melsheimer, 1845)
Tolidomordella discoidea flaviventris (Smith, 1883)
Tolidomordella fenestrata (Champion, 1891)

References

Mordellidae